Emerald Isle is a town in Carteret County, North Carolina, United States. It is part of the Crystal Coast and is located entirely on Bogue Banks. The population was 3,847 at the 2020 census, but as many as 50,000 tourists each week inhabit the area during the summer season, filling up vacant rental properties that do not count toward official census results.

Today, the oceanfront is lined with large and small homes, duplexes, condominiums, and one oceanfront hotel. Emerald Isle has a family-oriented atmosphere.

Recent beach renourishment projects in North Carolina, including Emerald Isle, have been both praised and questioned.

History

From about 1 AD to colonial times, Emerald Isle was home to Native Americans. Later, the area was settled by a small number of whalers and fishermen.

In the 1920s Henry Fort, who owned the Emerald Isle beaches and land surrounding them, hoped to open a large summer tourist attraction and ocean resort. Fort worked with developers, but the plans never materialized. After his death, his daughter Anita Maulick inherited Emerald Isle.

In 1951, seven people purchased the  stretch of island for $350,000 from Anita Maulick. The partners drew from a hat for the ownership of blocks. Because they wanted Emerald Isle to be family-oriented, the owners limited commercial development and mobile homes to five blocks each.

In 1960, ferry service began, providing wider access to the Bogue Banks beaches of modern-day Emerald Isle.

In 1971 the Cameron Langston Bridge was opened to provide access from Cedar Point to the western end of Bogue Banks and Emerald Isle. The bridge, spanning the Intracoastal Waterway, offers a great view of Bogue Sound and Bogue Banks. The opening of the bridge increased island development.

Emerald Isle is a popular vacation spot for families and is also known for excellent fishing and a wealth of marine life.Its beaches are a favorite location for nesting sea turtles, which are protected by federal law.

Geography
Emerald Isle is located in southwestern Carteret County at  (34.666994, -77.013482), at the western end of Bogue Banks, a barrier island. To the south is the Atlantic Ocean, and to the north is Bogue Sound separating the island from mainland North Carolina. The town extends to the western tip of the island, ending at Bogue Inlet, while to the east the town is bordered by Indian Beach.

Demographics

2020 census

As of the 2020 United States census, there were 3,847 people, 1,769 households, and 1,188 families residing in the town.

2000 census
As of the census of 2000, there were 3,488 people, 1,644 households, and 1,088 families residing in the town. The population density was 665.3 people per square mile (257.0/km2). There were 6,017 housing units at an average density of 1,147.8 per square mile (443.4/km2). The racial makeup of the town was 96.67% White, 0.80% African American, 0.46% Native American, 0.63% Asian, 0.03% Pacific Islander, 0.29% from other races, and 1.12% from two or more races. Hispanic or Latino of any race were 1.63% of the population.

There were 1,644 households, out of which 16.0% had children under the age of 18 living with them, 60.6% were married couples living together, 4.0% had a female householder with no male present, and 33.8% were non-families. 26.0% of all households were made up of individuals, and 8.6% had someone living alone who was 65 years of age or older. The average household size was 2.12 and the average family size was 2.49.

In the town, the population was spread out, with 13.1% under the age of 18, 4.8% from 18 to 24, 24.0% from 25 to 44, 35.7% from 45 to 64, and 22.4% who were 65 years of age or older. The median age was 50 years. For every 100 females, there were 105.5 males. For every 100 females age 18 and over, there were 105.8 males.

The median income for a household in the town was $53,274, and the median income for a family was $60,257. Males had a median income of $35,833 versus $28,417 for females. The per capita income for the town was $31,316. About 2.1% of families and 2.7% of the population were below the poverty line, including none of those under age 18 and 5.0% of those age 65 or over.

In popular culture 
Emerald Isle is featured heavily in the books of David Sedaris, most notably in Calypso.

Emerald Isle was also shown in an episode of HGTV’s Beachfront Bargain Hunt where various local landmarks and businesses were highlighted.

Emerald Isle is also where the fictional theme park, Mowgli's Place from "Abandoned By Disney" is located.

References

External links

 Town of Emerald Isle official website
 Emerald Isle InsiderInfo.us Area Guide
 Emerald Isle Attractions and Restaurants

Populated places established in 1951
Towns in Carteret County, North Carolina
Towns in North Carolina
Beaches of North Carolina
Bogue Banks
Landforms of Carteret County, North Carolina